TV Jovem Pan was a television station in São Paulo, Brazil which broadcast on Channel 16 UHF. Its headquarters were at Barra Funda, São Paulo. It was owned by Grupo Jovem Pan.

History 
Founded in 1990, TV Jovem Pan was the result of a partnership between businessman Antonio Augusto Amaral de Carvalho (Tuta), owner of Radio Jovem Pan, João Carlos di Genio (Goal), and Fernando Vieira de Mello, who shortly after sold his shares to Hamilton Lucas de Oliveira, owner of the IBF (Brazilian Industry Forms). 

Since its foundation, the station was involved in discord among the business groups involved in its installation and operation. Differences in the programming content to be adopted hamper its solidification.

TV Jovem Pan's programming was mainly documentaries, journalism and sports - especially football and soccer broadcasting in the team sports on Radio Jovem Pan AM.

With the scandal involving Lucas de Oliveira and his IBF, this is removed and the TV Jovem Pan is strongly shaken. Tuta withdrew from society and the station is only with João Carlos di Genio. In 1993, the lineup was virtually restricted to reruns. The Barra Funda headquarters and their modern equipment were sold to Rede Record.

References

See also 
 Jovem Pan

Television networks in Brazil
Mass media in São Paulo